The 1939–40 Panhellenic Championship was the 11th season of the highest football league of Greece and the last before the WW2 took place. It was carried out with a system similar to that of the previous season in which 14 teams participated again, 8 from the Central and 6 from Northern Greece, which were divided into groups. As in the previous year, in order to complete the championship, since it took a total of 30 matchdays, the teams that qualified for the national championship did not compete with each other again but transferred the mutual results of the local championships.

The teams of the Central Greece formed the Southern group and resulted as follows:
Athenian Championship: The first 5 teams of the ranking.
Piraeus' Championship: The first 3 teams of the ranking.

The teams of the Νorthern Group were initially divided into two subgroups. The teams of the Thessaloniki formed the Northern subgroup A and resulted as follows:
Macedonian Championship: The first 3 teams of the ranking.

The teams of Serres, Eastern Macedonia and Thrace formed the Northern subgroup B and resulted as follows:
Serres' Championship: The winner.
Thracian Championship: The winner.
Eastern Macedonian Championship: The winner.

The two winners competed in double games to become the champion of the Northern group. The champions of South and North, AEK Athens and PAOK, competed in a 2-legged final for the title. AEK was crowned champion for their 2nd Championship (2 consecutive), with Kleanthis Maropoulos being the protagonist as the last year. AEK had a great team then and throughout the year they had only one defeat in the Southern group against Olympiacos. Both in the local championship of Athens, and in both of the finals, AEK achieved only victories. The point system was: Win: 3 points - Draw: 2 points - Loss: 1 point.

Qualification round

Athens Football Clubs Association

Piraeus Football Clubs Association

 a. The ranking and the points are the final but the reported goal difference is of the 7th matchday.
 b. The ranking and the points are the final but the reported goal difference is of the penultimate (9th) matchday.

Macedonia Football Clubs Association

Semi-final round

Southern Group

Northern Group

Subgroup A

Subgroup B

Northern Group play-offs

|}

Finals

|+Summary

|}

Matches

AEK Athens won 5–3 on aggregate.

Top scorers

References

External links
Rsssf, 1939–40 championship
"Full review of championship games", newsp. "Athlitismos", dig. p. 147.

Panhellenic Championship seasons
Greece
1939–40 in Greek football